Werner Kuhnt (born 27 October 1893, date of death unknown) was a German international footballer.

References

1893 births
Year of death missing
Association football goalkeepers
German footballers
Germany international footballers